Hellevik Lighthouse is a coastal lighthouse in the municipality of Ålesund in Møre og Romsdal, Norway. It was first established in 1880, and was automated in 1973. The lighthouse was replaced by a smaller automated light in 1988.

See also

 List of lighthouses in Norway
 Lighthouses in Norway

References

External links
 Norsk Fyrhistorisk Forening 

Lighthouses completed in 1880
Lighthouses in Møre og Romsdal
Ålesund